Volunteering New Zealand (VNZ) is the national peak body for volunteering in New Zealand incorporated in 2001. It is an association of volunteer centres and national and other organisations with a commitment to volunteering. Current member organisations cover emergency services, health, welfare, education, culture, faith-based services, community support, ethnic groups, sport and recreation, conservation, special interests, advocacy and international volunteering.

In 2008, the contribution of volunteers in New Zealand was estimated to be at over $3.3 billion. A study published in 2016 found that New Zealand has one of the largest non-profit sectors in the world on a proportional basis, but that the majority of organisations find recruitment a challenge and that for many, the average age of their volunteers is increasing.

Governance
Volunteering New Zealand has an Executive Board of up to nine people. From the 2008 AGM, six are elected members with three appointed members – Maori, Pacific and Other Ethnicities.

Regional Volunteer Centres
New Zealand has various regional Volunteer Centres, listed below.
Volunteering Northland
Gisborne Volunteer Centre
New Plymouth Volunteer Service
Taupo Volunteer Centre
Volunteer Nelson
Volunteer Wellington
Volunteer Porirua
Volunteer Hutt
Volunteer Kapiti
Volunteer Western Bay of Plenty
Volunteer Whanganui
Volunteering Auckland
Volunteering Canterbury
Volunteering Hawkes Bay
Volunteering Mid & South Canterbury
Volunteering Otago
Volunteering Waikato
Volunteer Marlborough
Volunteer Resource Centre Manawatu & Districts

International link
Volunteering New Zealand is the New Zealand Representative of International Association for Volunteer Effort (IAVE). This is an international non-governmental organisation representing volunteerism worldwide. It has individual and organizational members in 80 countries. Volunteering NZ has also established good working relationships with Volunteering Australia which has made accessible a variety of educational resources and participation in their programmes. Our another great partner is Australasian Association of Volunteer Administrators (AAVA).

References

External links
Volunteering NZ homepage
Philanthropy New Zealand
Wellington City Council

Non-profit organisations based in New Zealand
Volunteer organizations